Meades is a surname. People with that name include:

 Christopher Meades, Vancouver novelist
 Jonathan Meades, English writer and broadcaster
 Jonathan Meades (footballer), Welsh footballer

See also
 Mead (disambiguation)
 Meade (disambiguation)
 Meades Ranch Triangulation Station, a geodetic base point at or near the geographic center of the forty-eight contiguous U.S. states
 Meads (disambiguation)
 Mede (disambiguation)
 Medes (disambiguation)